"Safe and Sound" is a song by American indie pop duo Capital Cities, written and produced by band members Ryan Merchant and Sebu Simonian. The song was released as a single on January 6, 2011, and first appeared on their debut EP Capital Cities (2011), later serving as the lead single from their debut studio album, In a Tidal Wave of Mystery (2013). "Safe and Sound" became the duo's breakout hit, peaking at number eight on the United States Billboard Hot 100 and achieving commercial success in several other territories. Three music videos were produced for the single, with the third video, directed by Grady Hall and set in the Los Angeles Theatre, later being nominated for Best Music Video at the 56th Annual Grammy Awards. It is the theme song for the Washington Capitals of the National Hockey League.

Background and composition
"Safe and Sound" is a synth-pop, dance-pop and alternative rock song, and was written and produced by Capital Cities members Ryan Merchant and Sebu Simonian. It features a prominent trumpet line, which was only incorporated into its production after eight previous takes of the song.

Music videos
The first music video for "Safe and Sound" was self-produced and edited by the band and uploaded to their official YouTube account on February 24, 2011. It features alternating historical film clips of dancing and war from the last century generally arranged in chronological order. Another video, directed by Jimmy Ahlander, was released on October 21, depicting the duo being led through a junkyard by a monk.

The third and most well-known video for the song was directed by Grady Hall and released on April 25, 2013. The video is set in the Los Angeles Theatre and depicts Capital Cities performing on stage as dancers of all types (1940s swing dancers, 1970s roller disco skaters, 1990s hip-hop dancers, etc.) emerge from pictures on the wall and film clips from different time periods in the theater's history come to life and compete in dance-offs. It received a nomination in the Best Music Video category at the 56th Annual Grammy Awards.

Cover versions and in other media
On November 7, 2013, the song was performed by Team Adam (consisted of Tessanne Chin, James Wolpert, Will Champlin, Grey and Preston Pohl) from the fifth season of the series, The Voice.

Zendaya, Kina Grannis, Kurt Hugo Schneider and Max Schneider (not related) released a cover of the song on March 31, 2014, used for a Coca-Cola commercial. Actual Coca-Cola bottles served as instruments in the version.

Air New Zealand have used the song in their in-flight safety video for 2014, while the Barcelona's Institute for Research in Biomedicine (IRB) has used it in its dance video to raise awareness and support for research into diseases such as cancer and metastasis, Alzheimer's and diabetes. 

The song is briefly played at a party scene in the beginning of the 2015 film Alvin and the Chipmunks: The Road Chip.

McDonald's has used the song in 2020 in McDonald's Australia promotion for the return of the McRib® & El Maco® as part of the that year’s summer menu.

Beginning in July 2021, the song was used in an advertising campaign for ADT Home Security titled “It’s Safe To Say”, which featured Drew and Jonathan Scott from the HGTV series “Property Brothers”.

Commercial performance
"Safe and Sound" first gained commercial success in Germany following its use in a Vodafone commercial, later topping the German Media Control singles chart. A sleeper hit, it peaked at number eight on the Billboard Hot 100 in September 2013, over two-and-a-half years after its initial release. It has sold over two million copies in the United States as of January 2014. It also reached #2 on the Mainstream Top 40 chart. In the United Kingdom, the single was added to the BBC Radio 2 playlist on August 31, 2013; following its official single release in the country the following month, it peaked at number 42 on the UK Singles Chart.

Awards and nominations

Track listing

 Digital download (single)
 "Safe and Sound" – 3:12

 Digital download (remix EP)
 "Safe and Sound"  – 4:12
 "Safe and Sound"  – 5:26
 "Safe and Sound"  – 2:52
 "Safe and Sound"  – 5:30
 "Safe and Sound"  – 5:22
 "Safe and Sound"  – 5:53
 "Safe and Sound"  – 7:48

 CD single (Germany)
 "Safe and Sound" – 3:12
 "Safe and Sound"  – 5:53

 11th Anniversary Bundle (remix EP)
 "Safe and Sound"  – 2:31
 "Safe and Sound"  – 2:41
 "Safe and Sound"  – 2:58
 "Safe and Sound"  – 3:08
 "Safe and Sound"  – 3:09
 "Safe and Sound"  – 2:31
 "Safe and Sound"  – 4:23

Charts

Weekly charts

Year-end charts

Decade-end charts

Certifications

Release history

References

2011 singles
Capital Cities (band) songs
Number-one singles in Germany
Number-one singles in Russia
Capitol Records singles
Record Report Pop Rock General number-one singles
2011 songs